Stadium FC Petržalka is a football stadium in Petržalka, Slovakia. It serves as home stadium for football club FC Petržalka. The stadium was built in 2011 and opened in 2012. The first match was played between the home club FC Petržalka 1898 and FC Nitra B, on 5 August 2012, Petržalka loss 1–3.

In the future, the capacity stadium is expected to be increased. During the first years, the stadium had a single grandstand with 800 seats.
Later the capacity was increased to 1500 (with 800 seats) and then it was increased to the current  capacity of 3000 with 1000 seats.

External links 
Stadium website

References

Football venues in Slovakia
Sport in Bratislava
Buildings and structures in Bratislava
Sports venues completed in 2012